Trial by Self is an American micro-budget independent film written and directed by Brandon Allen Powell.

It is the debut film of Brandon Allen Powell and was written to be as inexpensive to shoot as possible. In addition to writing and directing the film, Powell also produced, shot and edited the film himself.

Synopsis 

Torn apart by seemingly trivial life events, Tony Fisher, who was once a loving father and husband is now a self-destructive, despondent and emotionally unavailable man. His daughter Sarah avoids being at home because of the awkward family situation, while his wife Keri tries her best to reach Tony. The people around them are meeting violent ends and this is taking a toll on the family.

Cast 

The cast of Trial by Self is made up of mostly unknown actors. Many of the actors had no prior acting experience.

James Byron Houser as Tony Fisher  
Amanda Branham as Sarah Fisher
Cat Angle as Keri Fisher 
Robert W. Powell as James Grayson 
Jessica Guess as Jamie Grayson 
Michele Lamelza as Lisa Grayson
Lauren Doxey as Lindsey Dodson 
Kevin Crank as Detective Jack Preston
Nicole McKenzie as Detective Gina Garrett 
Jolie Mayfield as Kaitlyn Posey 
Shaiden Justice as Young Sarah

Production 

Trial by Self was written, directed, produced, shot, and edited by Brandon Allen Powell. It was shot over a very long period of time in the small town of Gorman, Texas.  The production faced many hardships as described in the Langdon Review of the Arts in Texas. In Volume 10 of the annual publication, Powell describes some of the challenges that he had to overcome while making the film and stated that, "A sane person would have simply given up. I made so many compromises that it became clear that the resulting film would not be my original vision."

Reception 

As of April 2013, Trial by Self was still making the festival circuit. It has been accepted to a number of film festivals and has been nominated for many awards at the festivals winning one award so far. A few reviews on the film have been published and they are generally positive.

External links

References 

2011 independent films
American independent films